James R. Fleming, born (London) 26 February 1944, is an English author (related to spy author Ian Fleming and travel writer Peter Fleming). He recently lived for the last twenty years in the remote North of Scotland in order to concentrate on his writing. This is where his Charlie Doig Russian series gestated. Well respected in the nearest town to his estate he became an honorary "Wicker" and fully immersed himself in community life.

He has written two historical novels, "Thomas Gage" and "The Temple of Optimism" and three thrillers, "Cold Blood", "White Blood" and "Rising Blood" that feature the Scottish/Russian character "Charlie Doig".

References

Bibliography
 personal website
 publisher's website
 publisher's website
 Review of "Temple of Optimism" in The Observer (2000)
 Review of "Thomas Gage" in The Telegraph (2003)
 Review of "White Blood" in The Guardian (2006)
 review of "Cold Blood" in The Times (2009)
 Review of "Rising Blood" in The Guardian (2011)

Living people
1944 births
20th-century English novelists
English historical novelists
Writers from London
English thriller writers
English male novelists
20th-century English male writers